= Setareh'yé Djéhane =

Persian/French bilingual newspaper

Setareh'yé Djéhane was a Persian/French bilingual newspaper published from Teheran, Iran, founded in 1928. It was published daily, except on Saturdays. As of 1937, Its owner and editor-in-chief was A. G. E'tessam-Zadeh (member of parliament and French Academy laureate) and its director was A. Malecki. The newspaper was dedicated to covering politics, economics and literature.
